The Sweden national wheelchair handball team is the national wheelchair handball team of Sweden and is controlled by the Swedish Handball Association. The Sweden became third at the 2016 European Wheelchair Handball Nations’ Tournament as host country.

Competitive record

European Wheelchair Handball Nations’ Tournament

References

External links 
 website
EHF Team Page

National wheelchair handball teams
Handball in Sweden
Handball-Wheelchair